As a surname:
Conrad Keely, American rock music singer
Dermot Keely, Irish professional football player and manager
John Ernst Worrell Keely (1827–1898), American inventor; invented the Keely Motor
Patrick Keely (fl. early 20th century), American church architect
Peter Keely, Irish footballer

As a given name:
Keely Smith (1928–2017), American jazz singer
Keely Shaye Smith, American journalist, author and television host
Keely Kelleher, American alpine skier
Keely Fitzgerald, American

Places
Keely, County Londonderry, a townland in County Londonderry, Northern Ireland

See also
Keeley (disambiguation)